Sylvain Bellemare (born February 20, 1968) is a Canadian sound editor and sound designer, best known internationally as the supervising sound editor of Arrival (2016), for which he won the BAFTA Award for Best Sound (shared with Claude La Haye and Bernard Gariépy Strobl) and the Academy Award for Best Sound Editing. He is also known for Soft Shell Man (2001), It's Not Me, I Swear!   (2008), Incendies (2010), Monsieur Lazhar (2011), Gabrielle (2013) and Endorphine (2015). He frequently works with Quebec filmmakers Philippe Falardeau or Denis Villeneuve.

Awards and nominations

References

External links
 

1968 births
Living people
Best Sound Editing Academy Award winners
Best Sound Editing Genie and Canadian Screen Award winners
Best Sound BAFTA Award winners
Canadian audio engineers
French Quebecers
People from Montreal
Canadian sound editors
Canadian sound designers